In structural geology and diagenesis, pressure solution or pressure dissolution is a deformation mechanism that involves the dissolution of minerals at grain-to-grain contacts into an aqueous pore fluid in areas of relatively high stress and either deposition in regions of relatively low stress within the same rock or their complete removal from the rock within the fluid. It is an example of diffusive mass transfer.

The detailed kinetics of the process was reviewed by Rutter (1976), and since then such kinetics has been used in
many applications in earth sciences.

Occurrence
Evidence for pressure solution has been described from sedimentary rocks that have only been affected by compaction. The most common example of this is bedding plane parallel stylolites developed in carbonates.

In a tectonic manner, deformed rocks also show evidence of pressure solution including stylolites at a high angle to bedding. The process is also thought to be an important part of the development of  cleavage.

Theoretical models

A theoretical model was formulated by Rutter, and a recent mathematical analysis was carried out, leading
to the so-called Fowler–Yang equations, which can explain the transition behaviour of pressure solution.

See also
 Fick's laws of diffusion
 Fold (geology)
 Rock microstructure
 Stylolite
 Terzaghi's principle

References

Limestone
Petrology
Sedimentary rocks
Structural geology